KHAS (1230 AM) is a radio station broadcasting an adult contemporary format. Licensed to Hastings, Nebraska, United States, the station serves the Grand Island-Kearney area.  The station is owned by Flood Communications Tri-Cities, L.L.C. and features programming from CBS News Radio.

The station was owned for many years by the family of Fred A. Seaton, which also owned KHAS-TV and still owns the Hastings Tribune newspaper.

References

External links

FCC History Cards for KHAS

HAS
Mainstream adult contemporary radio stations in the United States
Radio stations established in 1940
1940 establishments in Nebraska